Petr Pithart (born 2 January 1941) is a Czech politician, lawyer and political scientist who served as Prime Minister of the Czech Republic (then a federal region of Czechoslovakia) from 6 February 1990 to 2 July 1992. He was also the Senator for Chrudim from 1996 to 2012 and served as President of the Senate from 8 January 1996 to 16 December 1998 and again from 19 December 2000 to 15 December 2004.

On 1 January 2018 Pithart received the Order of the White Double Cross state award (second class) from Slovak President Andrej Kiska.

Political career
Pithart was a member of the Communist Party of Czechoslovakia from 1960, was active in the Prague Spring, and left the party after the Soviet invasion. He was later one of the most prominent dissidents against the communist regime, and was imprisoned for his activities, including being one of the first signatories of Charter 77. In 1989 he was one of the prominent leaders of the Civic Forum, founded at the start of the Velvet Revolution. Having participated in the negotiations leading to changes to the federal, Czech and Slovak governments, he was appointed Prime Minister of the Czech Socialist Republic.

Pithart is often characterised as a philosopher and thinker, rather than a tactical or charismatic leader. His 1990-92 Czech government was unable to deal with the growing power of federal Finance Minister Václav Klaus and his increasingly popular Civic Democratic Party, nor growing Slovak nationalism, which culminated in the dissolution of Czechoslovakia and defeat for Pithart's Civic Movement party.

Pithart was unsuccessful in his bid to become President of the Czech Republic at the 2003 election, losing to Václav Klaus.

In 1998 Pithart joined the Christian and Democratic Union - Czechoslovak People's Party. He was elected as senator in 1996, and re-elected in 2000 and 2006. He was the First Deputy Chairman of the Senate of the Parliament of the Czech Republic from 2004 to 2012. He retired in 2012.

References

External links

  http://www.pithart.cz – Official site

1941 births
Living people
Charter 77 signatories
Czech prisoners and detainees
Members of the Senate of the Czech Republic
Czechoslovak prisoners and detainees
Politicians from Kladno
Czech political scientists
Prime Ministers of the Czech Republic
Prisoners and detainees of Czechoslovakia
Communist Party of Czechoslovakia politicians
KDU-ČSL Senators
People of the Velvet Revolution
Grand Crosses with Star and Sash of the Order of Merit of the Federal Republic of Germany
Candidates in the 2003 Czech presidential election
KDU-ČSL presidential candidates
Civic Forum politicians
Civic Movement prime ministers
Civic Movement MPs
Charles University alumni
Presidents of the Senate of the Czech Republic